The Bănia is a left tributary of the river Nera in Romania. It flows into the Nera near Bozovici.

References

Rivers of Romania
Rivers of Caraș-Severin County